Bubblebath is the debut extended play (EP) by American singer and YouTube personality Poppy, under the name That Poppy. It was released digitally on February 12, 2016, by Island Records as her first and only release on the label. It preceded by a year and eight months the release of Poppy's debut studio album, Poppy.Computer, on October 6, 2017, after signing to Mad Decent.

Composition
Bubblebath carries a pop sound, while incorporating elements of ska-pop and punk. The track opens up with "Lowlife", a reggae song that serves as her first single. "Money" and "Altar" are described as "retro-bangers." "American Kids" lyrically talks about millennial stereotypes. Popular TV described the song as the "antithesis to Halsey's 'New Americana,' but "just as anthemic." Poppy states that the EP's name comes from the idea that the world is 'dirty' and would benefit from a bubblebath.

Critical reception
Tyler Peterson of UQMUSIC gave the EP a positive review, calling it a "little collection of some major millennial masterpieces." He further wrote: "Blazing full force with her Electra-Heart-meets-Princess-Peach persona, That Poppy is demonstrating some serious staying power with her committed visual and sonic aesthetics."

Promotion
"Lowlife" was released as a single on July 24, 2015. PopularTV has described the track as one that "will make you want to break out your old checkered Vans and hang with the skater boys." "Lowlife" was later featured on the compilation album Now That's What I Call Music! 58 in the United States, and a version of the track featuring rapper Travis Mills was released under Island Records in April 2016 and has received airplay on BBC Radio. A music video for the song was released in July 2015, premiering on Teen Vogue. In September 2016, "Lowlife" was nominated for a Tiger Beat "19 Under 19" Award for "Most Influential Song".

In July 2016, Poppy a music video for "Money", which kept a similar tone to her YouTube videos. "Money" was used in the first episode of the second season of the television series Scream, titled "I Know What You Did Last Summer", and was also re-recorded into Simlish for the video game The Sims 4, appearing on the "Tween Pop" radio station of the Kids Room Stuff pack. Money became a frequent encore song for Poppy's Poppy.Computer Tour.

Both songs were performed by Poppy on the Bubblebath Tour and the Poppy.Computer Tour.

Track listing
Credits adapted from iTunes Store.

References

2016 debut EPs
Island Records EPs
Pop music EPs
Poppy (entertainer) albums